American University of Sharjah (AUS) is a private university in the United Arab Emirates. It was founded in 1997 by Sultan bin Muhammad Al-Qasimi, Supreme Council Member and Ruler of Sharjah. Located in University City in Sharjah, AUS has more than 5,000 students from more than 94 countries and a full-time faculty of more than 360 from 48 countries.

AUS offers 26 majors and 48 minors at undergraduate level as well as 16 master's degrees and a PhD in Engineering Systems Management. The university is organized into three colleges and one school.

The university is licensed by the Commission for Academic Accreditation of the Ministry of Higher Education and Scientific Research Ministry of Higher Education and Scientific Research (UAE) in the United Arab Emirates, which recognizes all undergraduate and graduate programs. American University of Sharjah is accredited in the United States by the Middle States Commission on Higher Education.

History
The American University of Sharjah was founded in 1997 by the Emir of Sharjah, Sultan bin Muhammad Al-Qasimi.

AUS was granted a license by the UAE Ministry of Higher Education and Scientific Research in 1998 and held its first student council elections the same year. The subsequent year saw the university being granted a license by the UAE Commission for Academic Accreditation.

The development continued with the university launching its first graduate degree—a Master of Business Administration (MBA)—in 2000 and holding its first commencement the following year. The US Middle States Commission on Higher Education recognized this and, after a comprehensive assessment, granted accreditation to the university in 2004.

In 2006, Emir Al-Qasimi inaugurated the new AUS Library.

The university saw its student body cross the 5,000 mark in 2009. In 2010, the AUS Bachelor of Architecture degree program became the first outside of North America to be granted accreditation by the US National Architectural Accrediting Board (NAAB). In 2012, Forbes Middle East ranked the AUS MBA program as the best offered by a private university in the Gulf region.

Campus

American University of Sharjah is situated in University City, 16 kilometers (10 miles) from the center of Sharjah City and about 25 km from the neighboring emirate of Dubai.

AUS is the flagship institution of University City, a 1,600 acre complex that includes other educational establishments. The university has dormitories, a sports complex, and a gym. Other amenities include a health center, a pharmacy, a bank, a post office, a barbershop, a ladies beauty salon, and two convenience stores.

The center of the AUS campus comprises 12 academic buildings. The academic buildings house classrooms and lecture halls of various sizes; a library; science, language, computer and engineering laboratories; workshops and digital studios; and offices for faculty, academic administrators, and support staff.

The campus includes student residential halls (for men and for women) as well as a large Sports Complex and a Student Center. Approximately 40 percent of the student body lives in campus housing. Unlike most American universities, AUS requires faculty members and their families to live on campus with the intention of providing students with a learning and living environment that allows for on-going interaction with faculty members and their families.

Testing and Professional Development Center
The AUS Testing and Professional Development Center serves as a central point of testing for both the AUS campus and the community. The center accommodates the placement tests for newly AUS admitted students as well as university testing. The center is part of the ETS Strategic Testing Network and offers the ETS Internet-based TOEFL as well as an institutional paper-based TOEFL in addition to other testing services.

AUS is also the sole testing center in the United Arab Emirates for the Fundamentals of Engineering Exam (FE) and Professional Engineering Exam (PE) administrated by the National Council of Examiners for Engineering and Surveying (NCEES) in the USA.

Library
The AUS Library, an 11,000-square-meter facility, provides collections, services and programs to support the curricular and research needs of the university community. The majority of the library's rapidly growing physical collection of 141,000 items is in English; however, there are also materials available in Arabic. An online catalog system can be used to search for library materials from any location on or off campus. Using the library website, students and faculty can access e-books, online databases, full-text journals and other digital resources. The library works in conjunction with all parts of the university to provide academic resources for all classes taught at AUS. Facilities include PC workstations, an ‘information commons’ computer environment, two computer classrooms for teaching information literacy and research skills, book, study spaces, including group study and presentation rooms, media preview rooms; circulation/reserves and research help desks and self-checkout stations. The seating capacity is approximately 800. The AUS Archives department is a repository for institutional records that have been created by various academic and administrative departments of the university.

Transportation
AUS offers a shuttle bus service between the student residential halls and other areas of campus. The Transportation Services can also provide transportation to the cities of Sharjah, Dubai, Abu Dhabi and Al Ain. Transportation Services also provides information on local taxi and rental car services. [www.aus.edu/transportation]

Global rankings

American University of Sharjah was placed at 151-200 bracket in the THE Young University Rankings as well as at 201-250 bracket in the THE Asia University Rankings 2019.

For two years in a row, in 2017 and 2018, American University of Sharjah topped the Times Higher Education (THE) list of universities with the highest percentage of international students globally.

Student life

Student Publications
Practical writing experience is available to AUS students through three student publications, The Leopard, Realms and Arabian Leopard.

The Leopard Newspaper: “A Reason to Roar”: The Leopard is an official university newspaper and a voice of AUS students. The leopard is the official AUS mascot and was chosen because the UAE preserves and protects the Arabian leopard, which is currently on the brink of extinction.

Realms: This magazine was founded as a literary outlet for AUS students.

Arabian Leopard: The Arabian Leopard newspaper gives students the chance to develop and present their Arabic writing skills and creative writing.

Model United Nations
American University of Sharjah Model United Nations, or AUSMUN,  is an annual high school and university conference organized by the International Studies department at the American University of Sharjah in the United Arab Emirates.

International exchange programs
The Office of International Exchange Programs was established to provide AUS students and faculty with exchange opportunities, including sending and hosting visiting scholars, aiding faculty members in arranging international study tours, developing exchange agreements with universities around the world, and achieving membership in the top global exchange consortia.

The Office of International Exchange Programs works with AUS students who wish to study at universities in other countries either for a semester or a year. The office also facilitates the admission of international students coming to AUS to study.

In addition to facilitating student exchanges and study abroad, the AUS Office of International Exchange Programs also administers processes enabling faculty-led study tours, visiting scholars, visiting guests and delegations, tuition exchange programs, and the dissemination of information regarding international scholarships and internships.

Notable alumni
 Fadel Al Mheiri, filmmaker
 Mishal Hamed Kanoo, Chairman of The Kanoo Group
 Sheikha Lubna Khalid Al Qasimi, UAE Minister for Foreign Trade and former Minister of Economic and Planning (2004–2008); first woman to hold a ministerial post in the UAE
 Sarah Al Amiri, Chair of the United Arab Emirates Council of Scientists and Deputy Project Manager of the Emirates Mars Mission.
 Adib Fahim ex deputy intelligence director of Afghanistan

Gallery

See also

 Americans in the United Arab Emirates

American universities in the Middle East:
American University of Cairo (AUC)
American University of Beirut (AUB)
American University of Iraq - Sulaimani (AUI)
American University of Kuwait (AUK)
American University in Dubai (AUD)

References

 
Education in the Emirate of Sharjah
Universities and colleges in Sharjah (city)
Buildings and structures in Sharjah (city)
Educational institutions established in 1997
Sharjah (city)
University City of Sharjah
1997 establishments in the United Arab Emirates